Charles Augustus Biot Jr. (October 18, 1917 – March 10, 2000) was an American Negro league outfielder from 1939 to 1941. 

A native of Orange, New Jersey, Biot played baseball at East Orange High School, and broke into the Negro leagues in 1939. He played for the Newark Eagles, New York Black Yankees, and Baltimore Elite Giants.

Biot served in the United States Army during World War II, and was assigned to the Harlem Hellfighters, where he captained his division's baseball team. He died in East Orange in 2000 at age 82.

References

External links
 and Seamheads 

1917 births
2000 deaths
Baltimore Elite Giants players
East Orange High School alumni
New York Black Yankees players
Newark Eagles players
People from East Orange, New Jersey
People from Orange, New Jersey
Sportspeople from Essex County, New Jersey
African Americans in World War II
United States Army personnel of World War II
Baseball outfielders
African-American United States Army personnel